Hugon Hanke (26 March 1904 – 19 December 1964) was a Polish politician, best known for being 38th Prime Minister of Poland and 8th Prime Minister of the Republic of Poland in Exile (in 1955) and for his unexpected return to the Communist-ruled country while serving as PM.

He was involved in politics during the Second Polish Republic before World War II. He was an active member of the Christian Workers Union (Chrześcijańskie Związki Zawodowe) and of the Labour Party (Stronnictwo Pracy) in Silesia.

During the war he served as a soldier in the Polish army in the West.

After Prime Minister in Exile Stanisław Mackiewicz fled back to Poland, Hanke was named as his successor by President August Zaleski and served from 8 August to 10 September 1955.

Like his predecessor, he left London and fled to Poland.

According to many documents, he was, before his return to Poland, a Communist secret agent for over three years.

Hugon Hanke Government (8 August – 10 September 1955)

 Hugon Hanke - Prime Minister
 Kazimierz Okulicz - Minister of Justice
 Zygmunt Rusinek - Minister of Emigration Affairs
 Stanisław Sopicki - Minister of the Treasury, Labour and Trade
 General Michał Karaszewicz-Tokarzewski - Minister of National Defense and General Inspector of the Armed Forces
 Antoni Pająk - Minister of Congressional Works

References

1904 births
1964 deaths
Labor Party (Stronnictwo Pracy) politicians
Prime Ministers of Poland
Burials at Powązki Military Cemetery